KS Piast Nowa Ruda is Polish sports club from Nowa Ruda in Lower Silesia. It is most well known for its football teams, despite lack of on-field success, which includes junior and women's teams. The club also has archery, athletics, swimming, volleyball, table tennis and skiing sections.

History 

On 11 July 1946 a sports club was established by the local coal mine by the name KS Nowa Ruda and its history has been intertwined with that of the local mine. That same year the name changed to Klub Sportowy Węglowiec. In 1949 another name change meant that the club was called KS Górnik. In 1955 a merger of the club with another local team Włókniarz Nowa Ruda caused the new club to become ZKS Piast Nowa Ruda, a name which became legally recognised in 1957. Under the decision of the Minister of Mining and Energy in 1972 another merger took place when the local mine in Nowa Ruda was merged with another mine in Słupiec to become one, which meant that its two football teams also merged, therefore ZKS Górnik Słupiec merged with Piast to become GKS Piast Nowa Ruda before finally reverting it original prefix KS in 1992, a name which remains to this day. The club's biggest footballing achievements came in the mid-1980s and early 1990s where the team has enjoyed spells in the higher leagues, including a season in the second highest division and several in the third tier.

Achievements
 In II liga:
 3rd place: 1987/1988
 In III liga
 1st place: 1985/1986
 3rd place: 1989/1990
 4th place: 1991/1992
 5th place: 1992/1993
 10th place: 1993/1994
 9th place: 1994/1995
 9th place: 1995/1996
 17th place: 1996/1997
 Polish Cup
 1/8th: 1984/1985

Fans
Piast has a small but loyal and fanatical following. They have friendships with fans of Nysa Zgorzelec, Polonia Bystrzyca Kłodzka, Bielawianka Bielawa and Kryształ Stronie Śląskie. Piast fans also follow the local powerhouse WKS Śląsk Wrocław. They have rivalries with Górnik Wałbrzych, Lechia Dzierżoniów and Moto-Jelcz Oława.

References

Football clubs in Poland
Association football clubs established in 1946
1946 establishments in Poland
Football clubs in Lower Silesian Voivodeship
Nowa Ruda